Nicolás Giacobone is an Argentine writer and screenwriter. He won the Academy Award for Best Original Screenplay for the 2014 film Birdman at the 87th Academy Awards in 2015. He wrote a book of short stories Algún Cristo (2001), and the novel The Crossed-Out Notebook (2018). His latest screenplay is for the film John and the Hole which was part of the official selection of the 2020 Cannes Film Festival and premiered at the 2021 Sundance Film Festival.

Personal life
His maternal grandfather was film director Armando Bó, his uncle is actor Víctor Bó, and his cousin is fellow screenwriter Armando Bó, with whom he won the Oscar.

Filmography

References

External links 
 

Year of birth missing (living people)
Living people
Argentine people of Italian descent
Argentine screenwriters
Male screenwriters
Argentine male writers
Best Original Screenplay Academy Award winners
Best Screenplay AACTA International Award winners